Two-time defending champion Rafael Nadal defeated Stefanos Tsitsipas in the final, 6–2, 6–1 to win the singles tennis title at the 2018 Barcelona Open. With the win, Nadal retained the ATP no. 1 singles ranking. It was Nadal's record-extending eleventh Barcelona Open title and his 20th ATP 500 title overall, equaling Roger Federer's record. It was Tsitsipas' maiden ATP Tour final.

Seeds
All seeds received a bye into the second round.

Draw

Finals

Top half

Section 1

Section 2

Bottom half

Section 3

Section 4

Qualifying

Seeds

Qualifiers

Lucky losers

Qualifying draw

First qualifier

Second qualifier

Third qualifier

Fourth qualifier

Fifth qualifier

Sixth qualifier

References

External links
 Main draw
 Qualifying draw

2018 ATP World Tour